Severiano Ballesteros Sota (9 April 1957 – 7 May 2011) was a Spanish professional golfer, a World No. 1 who was one of the sport's leading figures from the mid-1970s to the mid-1990s. A member of a gifted golfing family, he won 90 international tournaments in his career, including five major championships between 1979 and 1988; The Open Championship three times and the Masters Tournament twice. He gained attention in the golfing world in 1976, when at the age of 19, he finished second at The Open. He played a leading role in the re-emergence of European golf, helping the European Ryder Cup team to five wins both as a player and captain.

Ballesteros won a record 50 European Tour titles. He won at least one European Tour title for 17 consecutive years between 1976 and 1992. His final victory was at the 1995 Peugeot Spanish Open. Largely because of back-related injuries, Ballesteros struggled with his form during the late 1990s. Despite this, he continued to be involved in golf, creating the Seve Trophy and running a golf course design business. In 2000, Golf Digest magazine ranked Ballesteros as the greatest Continental European golfer of all time.

In the 2000s, Ballesteros played sparingly due to continuing back problems and in 2007 he eventually retired from competitive professional golf. In 2008 he was diagnosed with a malignant brain tumour. Ballesteros was awarded the Lifetime Achievement Award for the second time at the BBC Sports Personality Awards in 2009. He was presented with the award at his home in Spain by his compatriot and former Ryder Cup teammate José María Olazábal.

Ballesteros died of brain cancer on 7 May 2011, aged 54.

Career outline

Early life and career
Severiano Ballesteros Sota was born in the village of Pedreña, Cantabria, Spain, on 9 April 1957, the youngest of five sons of Baldomero Ballesteros Presmanes (1919–1987), who was a farm labourer, and Carmen Sota Ocejo (1919–2002). One died in childhood, all the others became professional golfers. He learned the game while playing on the beaches near his home, at the time while he was supposed to be in school, mainly using a 3-iron given to him by his older brother Manuel when he was eight years old. His maternal uncle Ramón Sota was Spanish professional champion four times and finished sixth in the Masters Tournament in 1965. Ballesteros' older brother Manuel finished in the top 100 on the European Tour Order of Merit every year from 1972 to 1983, and later became Ballesteros' manager. His brothers Vicente and Baldomero, and nephew Raúl are also professional golfers.

Ballesteros turned professional in March 1974 at the age of 16. He burst onto the international scene with a second-place finish in 1976 Open Championship at Royal Birkdale Golf Club. He led by two shots after the third round, but a final round 74 saw him tie with Jack Nicklaus, six shots behind the winner Johnny Miller. He went on to win the European Tour Order of Merit (money title) that year, a title that he would win the next two years, and six times total, a record at the time (since surpassed by Colin Montgomerie). Ballesteros won his first Open Championship in 1979 with a closing 70, a round in which he famously hit his tee shot into a car park on the 16th hole yet still made a birdie.

Ballesteros went on to win five major championships: the Masters Tournament in 1980 and 1983, and The Open Championship in 1979, 1984 and 1988. His 1980 Masters win was the first by a European player, and at the time he was the youngest winner of the tournament, at age 23 (though this record was broken by Tiger Woods in 1997, when he was 21 years old). His 1979 win at The Open Championship similarly made him the youngest winner of the tournament in the 20th century, and the first golfer from continental Europe to win a major since Frenchman Arnaud Massy won The Open in 1907. Ballesteros won the rain delayed Masters in 1983 by 5 shots. Ballesteros described the putt he holed on the 18th green at St Andrews to win the 1984 Open Championship as "the happiest moment of my whole sporting life."

On 30 September 1983, Ballesteros joined the PGA Tour. In 1984 he played in 15 tournaments, the minimal amount allowed for a golfer with membership. The following season he played in only 9 tournaments. He was subsequently suspended by the PGA Tour for failing to meet his commitment.

In 1988, Ballesteros won his fifth and last major title, The Open Championship at Royal Lytham & St Annes. The final round was played on Monday after torrential rain had flooded the course and forced Saturday's play to be abandoned. He described his final round of 65 which beat Nick Price by two shots as "perhaps the best round of my entire career."

For much of the 1980s and 1990s, Ballesteros was a mainstay of the European Ryder Cup team. He scored 22½ points in 37 matches against the United States; his partnership with fellow Spaniard José María Olazábal was the most successful in the history of the competition, with 11 wins and two halved matches out of 15 pairs matches. While Ballesteros was a member of European sides that won the Ryder Cup in 1985, retained the Cup in 1987 and 1989, and regained the Cup in 1995, the pinnacle of his career in the competition came in 1997, when he captained the winning European side at Valderrama Golf Club in Sotogrande, Spain. This was the first Ryder Cup ever held in continental Europe.

Ballesteros led the Official World Golf Ranking for a total of 61 weeks in the period from their inauguration (in April 1986) to September 1989, including being world number one at the end of the 1988 season. He also led McCormack's World Golf Rankings, published in McCormack's "World Of Professional Golf" annuals (from which the official rankings were developed) in 1983, 1984 and 1985. He was ever-present in the end of season world's top ten according to those rankings for fifteen years, from 1977 to 1991 inclusive.

Late career and retirement
In 1999, Ballesteros was inducted into the World Golf Hall of Fame. He was instrumental in introducing the Seve Trophy in 2000, a team competition similar to the Ryder Cup pitting a team from Great Britain and Ireland against one from continental Europe. In 2000, Ballesteros was ranked as the 16th greatest golfer of all time by Golf Digest magazine; he was the top golfer from the continent of Europe.

Ballesteros had played sparingly since the late 1990s because of back problems, and made his first start in years at the 2005 Madrid Open. He stated a desire to play more tournaments in the 2006 season. He entered the 2006 Open Championship, having played just one other event on the European Tour, The Open de France Alstom, where he missed the cut. He ran a thriving golf course design business and had been eligible for the Champions Tour and European Seniors Tour upon turning 50 in 2007. Ballesteros had been the captain of the European team in the Royal Trophy since its inception in 2006. He was announced again as non-playing captain of the 2008 European team to defend the Royal Trophy against the Asian team at the Amata Spring Country Club in Bangkok.

After further recurrences of his back problems, which contributed to his finishing tied for last in his only Champions Tour start, Ballesteros announced his retirement from golf on 16 July 2007, bringing down the curtain on an illustrious career. During the news conference, he also addressed reports in European media that he had attempted suicide, saying that those reports "were not even close to reality". He had been briefly hospitalized when he became concerned about the condition of his heart, but was released the same day after being given a clean bill of health.

Ballesteros was a member of the Laureus World Sports Academy. He had become involved in European golf course design in his later years, most famously altering the 17th hole at Valderrama before the 1997 Ryder Cup.

Personal life
Ballesteros was married to Carmen Botín O'Shea, daughter of Emilio Botín, from 1988 until their divorce in 2004, in the municipality of Marina de Cudeyo in Cantabria. The couple had three children, Javier, Miguel and Carmen. The marriage was said to have run into trouble when Ballesteros could not accept the fact his career was on the wane.

Brain tumour and death
At Madrid-Barajas Airport on 6 October 2008, Ballesteros lost consciousness and was admitted to hospital. Six days later, he confirmed that he had been diagnosed with a malignant brain tumour. On 15 October, Spanish news agency EFE reported that he had undergone a 12-hour operation to resect the tumour, the first of four operations he would have. A hospital spokeswoman stated that surgeons had removed a sizable part of the tumour. On 23 October, it was confirmed publicly that the tumour was classified as a cancerous oligoastrocytoma, and after a rapid deterioration of his health, further surgery took place on 24 October to stabilize him and try to remove the remainder of the tumour. On 24 October, it was confirmed that the tumour had been removed after a 6½-hour operation. On 3 November, it was confirmed by the hospital that he was starting his rehabilitation in the intensive care unit, and was breathing steadily. On 18 November, he was moved out of the intensive care unit and changed wards at Madrid's La Paz Hospital to continue his rehabilitation.

Ballesteros was discharged from hospital on 9 December 2008. He then returned home to northern Spain and underwent chemotherapy treatment as an outpatient. In January 2009, a message on his website said he had responded well to one course of chemotherapy.
I am very motivated and working hard although I am aware that my recovery will be slow and therefore I need to be patient and have a lot of determination.
For these reasons I am following strictly all the instructions that the doctors are giving me.
Besides, the physiotherapists are doing a great job on me and I feel better every day.
Ballesteros completed a second course of chemotherapy at Madrid's La Paz Hospital in February 2009. Speaking through his website he said, "The results of the check-up were really positive, better even than the first ones." He finished a third round of treatment in March 2009, and completed his fourth and final course of chemotherapy a month later.

In June 2009, Ballesteros made his first public appearance after treatment for the brain tumour. He said it was a "miracle" to be alive and he thanked everyone who had been involved in his care and welfare.

At his first public appearance, Ballesteros announced the launch of the "Seve Ballesteros Foundation". This foundation was set up to help those with cancer fight it. The foundation aims to research cancer, especially brain tumours, but it will also help financially challenged young golfers, so they might be as successful as he.

On 6 May 2011, Ballesteros' family released a statement announcing that his neurological condition had "suffered a severe deterioration". He died within hours of the announcement in the early hours of 7 May 2011 at the age of 54; his older brother Baldomero confirmed the precise time of death at 2:10 am CEST.

Tributes
The Open de España was underway when Ballesteros died. The European Tour marked his death with a moment of silence during the third round at the Real Club de Golf El Prat in Barcelona.

Tiger Woods described Ballesteros as "one of the most talented and exciting golfers to ever play the game". Lee Westwood said of Ballesteros, "Seve made European golf what it is today".

Phil Mickelson, who won the 2010 Masters Tournament, selected a Spanish-themed menu for the 2011 Masters Champions Dinner in honour of Ballesteros, who was too ill to attend. Entrees included seafood paella and manchego-topped filet mignon, with a salad course, asparagus, and tortillas as sides, plus ice cream-topped apple empanada for dessert.

At the Madrid Open tennis tournament, a moment of silence was held prior to the semi-final match between Rafael Nadal and Roger Federer. Nadal, a close friend of Ballesteros, was seen wiping away tears as he watched the video screen.

On 8 May, at 15:08 EST, the three major U.S. men's tours stopped play and held a moment of silence.

On 10 May, the Irish Independent said of him: "He spoke many other languages too: the dialects of honour, of dignity, of sportsmanship, of decency, of fair play, of loyalty, of integrity, and in the end, of dauntless, unforgettable, astonishing courage. Quite simply, there has never been a finer ambassador for either his sport or his country."

A funeral service was held for Ballesteros, previously cremated, at the parish church of San Pedro, in his home village of Pedreña. Due to the number of those in attendance, several big screens were installed outside the 400-capacity church. His ashes were then to be scattered at his home estate.

The day of Ballesteros' death, the Spanish flag was raised at the World Golf Hall of Fame in Florida, the United States flag was lowered to half-staff, a photo of Ballesteros was hung in the box office, and a black ribbon was hung on the outside of his locker. The next weekend, at nearby TPC Sawgrass, the Spanish flag was flown at half-staff during the 2011 Players Championship at the request of defending champion Tim Clark, in place of his native South African flag. Clark went on to state, "Seve was a hero of mine growing up...In losing [him] last week, I think the whole golfing world is saddened by that. To have his flag up here is just a small little tribute to him. Obviously he deserves a whole lot more."

Legacy
The 2012 Ryder Cup, the first to be played after Ballesteros' death, saw the European team wearing navy blue and white garments on the final day in memory of Seve, who traditionally wore navy blue on the last day of a tournament. Additionally, the team's kit also bore the silhouette of Ballesteros after his win at the 1984 Open Championship. The Irish golfer Pádraig Harrington, Nick Faldo, and other European players proposed that the PGA replace the image of Harry Vardon on the European Tour's official logo with one of Ballesteros (a silhouette of the iconic image of Ballesteros' "salute", following his win at the 1984 Open Championship).

The airport of Ballesteros' homeland, Cantabria, has been named after him since the Spanish Government approved the change on 16 April 2015. The name was changed from Santander Airport to Seve Ballesteros – Santander Airport. This change was made after the regional parliament unanimously approved a petition in May 2014. The motivation behind this popular initiative was to honor Ballesteros for being one of the most universal of Cantabrians and an example in sports and life.

In 2017, the European Tour Players' Player of the Year award was renamed in his honour. The first recipient of The Seve Ballesteros Award was Henrik Stenson.

Professional wins (90)

PGA Tour wins (9)

*Note: The 1985 USF&G Classic was reduced to 54 holes due to inclement weather.

PGA Tour playoff record (1–2)

European Tour wins (50)

*Ballesteros and Langer agreed to share the 1986 Trophée Lancôme after failing light caused play to halt after four holes of a playoff.

European Tour playoff record (8–4–1)

Japan Golf Tour wins (6)

Japan Golf Tour playoff record (1–1)

PGA Tour of Australasia wins (2)

Safari Circuit wins (1)

Other wins (27)
1974 Spanish National Championship for under 25s, Open de Vizcaya
1975 Spanish National Championship for under 25s
1976 Memorial Donald Swaelens, Cataluña Championship, Tenerife Championship, Lancome Trophy, World Cup of Golf (with Manuel Piñero)
1977 Braun International Golf (Germany), World Cup of Golf (with Antonio Garrido)
1978 Spanish National Championship for under 25s
1979 Open el Prat
1981 Suntory World Match Play Championship
1982 Masters de San Remo (Italy), Suntory World Match Play Championship
1983 Million Dollar Challenge (South Africa)
1984 Suntory World Match Play Championship, Million Dollar Challenge (South Africa)
1985 Spanish Professional Closed Championship, Suntory World Match Play Championship, Campeonato de España-Codorniu
1987 Spanish Professional Closed Championship
1988 APG Larios
1991 Toyota World Match Play Championship
1992 Copa Quinto Centenario por Equipos
1995 Tournoi Perrier de Paris (with José María Olazábal)

Major championships

Wins (5)

Results timeline

CUT = missed the half-way cut
DQ = disqualified
"T" = tied

Summary

Most consecutive cuts made – 10 (1984 U.S. Open – 1986 Open Championship)
Longest streak of top-10s – 4 (1984 Open Championship – 1985 U.S. Open)

Results in The Players Championship

CUT = missed the halfway cut
"T" indicates a tie for a place

Team appearances
Ryder Cup (representing Europe): 1979, 1983, 1985 (winners), 1987 (winners), 1989 (tied, cup retained), 1991, 1993, 1995 (winners), 1997 (winners – non-playing captain)

World Cup (representing Spain): 1975, 1976 (winners), 1977 (winners), 1991
Double Diamond International: 1975 (Rest of the World), 1976 (Continental Europe), 1977 (Continental Europe)
Hennessy Cognac Cup (representing the Continent of Europe): 1976, 1978, 1980
Dunhill Cup (representing Spain): 1985, 1986, 1988
Seve Trophy (representing continental Europe): 2000 (winners - playing captain), 2002 (playing captain), 2003 (playing captain), 2005 (non-playing captain), 2007 (non-playing captain)
Royal Trophy (representing Europe): 2006 (winners – non-playing captain), 2007 (winners – non-playing captain)

Equipment
Ballesteros used Ping putters consistently throughout his career and has more golden clubs for wins in the Ping Gold Putter Vault than any other player.

See also

List of golfers with most European Tour wins
List of golfers with most PGA Tour wins
List of men's major championships winning golfers
List of golf course architects

References

External links

Seve Ballesteros profile at Golf Legends
Official Seve Ballesteros Foundation homepage
Official home page for the Seve Ballesteros Golf Academy
The Economist Obituary
New York Times Obituary
Los Angeles Times Obituary
The Guardian Obituary

Spanish male golfers
Golfers from Cantabria
European Tour golfers
PGA Tour golfers
Ryder Cup competitors for Europe
Winners of men's major golf championships
World Golf Hall of Fame inductees
Golf course architects
BBC Sports Personality World Sport Star of the Year winners
BBC Sports Personality Lifetime Achievement Award recipients
People from Trasmiera
Deaths from brain cancer in Spain
1957 births
2011 deaths